A constitutional referendum was held in Uzbekistan on 27 January 2002. Voters were asked two questions; one on extending the presidential term from five to seven years, and a second on introducing a bicameral parliament. Both were approved by over 90% of voters. Voter turnout was reported to be 92%.

Results

Introducing a bicameral parliament

Presidential term extension

References

Uzbekistan
Constitutional
Referendums in Uzbekistan
Constitutional referendums